Jewel is a 2001 television drama film directed by Paul Shapiro, based on the book of the same name by Bret Lott.

Plot
In 1945, Jewel Hilburn (Farrah Fawcett), 39, and her husband Leston (Patrick Bergin), 41, are living in poverty in rural Mississippi, and raising their four children: Raylene (Rachel Skarsten), Burton (Kyle Fairlie), Wilman (Max Morrow), and Annie (Alexis Vandermaelen). All four children were nannied by Jewel's friend and housekeeper, Cathedral (Cicely Tyson). Leston makes a living pulling out pine stumps for the war effort. Cathedral's husband, Nelson (Ardon Bess), and their sons, Sepulchur and Temple, all work for Leston.

The Hilburns discover that Jewel is pregnant, and decide it will be their last child. Cathedral has a premonition and warns Jewel that the child will bring hardship and test her, but that it is God's way of smiling down on Jewel. The Hilburns name the baby girl Brenda Kay. In time it becomes obvious that Brenda Kay is developing much slower than other children. At six months old, she lies very still, when other children her age are able to roll over.

The Hilburns consult their physician, Dr. Beaudry, who calls Dr. Basket, his former teacher and the best paediatrician in the South, to make a diagnosis. He tells Jewel and Leston that Brenda Kay has Down syndrome, and recommends placing her in an institution with other children with the condition, as she would be a huge burden on them and the rest of the family. He predicts that the baby is unlikely to survive past her second birthday.

Outraged, Jewel refuses, insisting she will care for her daughter at home as part of the family. Beaudry tells Jewel that Brenda Kay should receive regular injections to strengthen her bones. The injections are expensive, but the Hilburns manage to pay for them, even when times get tougher after Leston loses his job. The kids sell the vegetables the family grows, Raylene quits school and gets a job, and Jewel takes on sewing work. Meanwhile, Jewel concentrates her attention on caring for Brenda Kay, who survives, but misses developmental milestones. Aged seven, Brenda Kay walks downstairs by herself for the first time. Brenda Kay's constant needs mean Jewel has less time and energy for her older children.

Jewel reads of a "miracle school" in Los Angeles, California, that is reputed to help children like Brenda Kay, and proposes that the family moves there to find work while Brenda Kay attends the school. While Leston considers, Burton decides to go to California immediately to look for work. Brenda Kay, meanwhile, has a couple of near brushes with death.

Jewel has secretly applied to the special school and Brenda Kay has been accepted. To raise money, Jewel secretly starts selling items from her home. Eventually Leston notices and confronts her. After an argument, he agrees to move to California, on condition that they return to Mississippi someday.

Except Raylene, who gets married and stays in Mississippi, the Hilburns relocate to Los Angeles to reunite with Burton, now working at a garage. Leston finds work, and Brenda Kay enrolls in the school, run by director Nathan White. For the first time, Brenda Kay meets other children like herself, and Jewel is not solely responsible for her.

In 1961, Brenda Kay is sixteen. The school has not raised Brenda Kay's attainment, but Leston has a better job, and Jewel works at the school as an assistant. White suggests to Jewel that she must let go of Brenda Kay, as her efforts are holding her daughter back. Keeping her promise to Leston, they return to Mississippi to search for a new house, but Leston realizes that his home is now in Los Angeles, and Mississippi is his past. They return to California and resume their lives. Gradually, Jewel accepts White's argument that Brenda Kay must be allowed to live her own life. White recommends a group home for adults with Down Syndrome, where Brenda Kay will learn to live independently from Jewel's over-protective care.

The Hilburns leave Brenda Kay at the home with the new friends she has made. Jewel visits her often, but has finally realized the importance of letting her grow by herself.

Cast
Farrah Fawcett  as Jewel Hilburn
Patrick Bergin  as Leston Hilburn
Cicely Tyson  as Cathedral
Laura Mercer  as Brenda Kay (ages 8–9)
Ashley Wolfe  as Brenda Kay (age 16)
Rachel Skarsten  as Raylene (age 14)
Natalie Radford  as Raylene (ages 22–30)
Alexis Vandermaelen  as Annie (age 3–4)
Charlotte Arnold as Annie (ages 7–11)
Kristin Booth  as Annie (age 19)
Max Morrow  as Wilman (age 10–11)
Robin Dunne  as Wilman (ages 18–26)
Kylie Fairlie  as Burton (age 11)
Kelly Harms  as Burton ages (19–27)
Dylan Harman as Dennis (age 9)
Kenny Freeman  as Dennis (age 16)
Nola Augustson  as Mrs. Hamby
Sean Bell  as Gower Cross
Ardon Bess  as Nelson
Jayne Bickman  as Rachel
Geoffrey Bowes  as Dr. Beaudry
Lori Cooke  as Sammy
Peter Donaldson  as Nathan White
Isabella Fink  as Elaine Cross
Dallas Goyo  as Matthew Cross
Lynne Griffin  as Nancy Tindle
Maggie Huculak  as Nancy
Stacia Langdon  as Olivia
Shawn Lawrence  as Larry Tindle
Ron Payne  as Dr. Basket
Toby Proctor  as Gene
Kim Roberts  as May
Gema Zamprogna  as Sarah

External links
 

2001 television films
2001 films
Canadian drama television films
English-language Canadian films
2001 drama films
Lifetime (TV network) films
2000s Canadian films
2000s British films
British drama television films